Helge Ziethen (born 22 November 1952 in Rostock) is a German former diver who competed in the 1972 Summer Olympics.

References

1952 births
Living people
German male divers
Olympic divers of East Germany
Divers at the 1972 Summer Olympics
Sportspeople from Rostock
20th-century German people